Massimo Di Gesu is an Italian composer, born in 1970.

Academic studies 
At the Milan Conservatory Di Gesu attained the Diploma in Piano in 1992, and the Diploma in Composition in 1995. He studied composition with Bruno Bettinelli, and piano with Anita Porrini, one of Cortot's and Benedetti Michelangeli's pupils. Besides further piano studies with Valerio Premuroso, he attended post-graduate composition courses at the Petrassi Academy (Parma), at the University of Central England (Birmingham), and at the University of Leeds.

Style 
His approach to composition (alien to fashionable currents, and based on a distinctly atonal harmonic idiom) focuses on the symbols hidden in the syntax of sounds, being his language characterised by the search for a perceptible principle of attraction linking the elements of the musical narrative.

Partnerships and collaborations 
Di Gesu's debut at La Scala Theatre took place in May 2013, when La Scala String Quartet premiered his "Verdigo",
 a work which the ensemble had commissioned on the occasion of the bicentennial of Giuseppe Verdi's birth. 
La Scala String Quartet had already played Di Gesu's works such as "Ansikte mot ansikte" (for Serate Musicali - Milano, and Ente Concerti Pesaro) and "WOLFiliGrANG" (at the Rovereto Mozart Festival).

In 2014 the Teatro La Fenice (Venice) commissioned from him "Luci d'estate" which was premiered by the Ex Novo Ensemble in July of the same year.

Other artistic partners of Di Gesu's are

 Peter Bradley-Fulgoni, who has performed works of his in venues like St Martin-in-the-Fields - London, Salle Cortot - Paris, Skrjabin Museum, Richter Memorial Apartment – Moscow; besides, he has included various works of his in his CDs "PianOLYPHONY" and "PianOLYPTYCHS".
 Wiener Virtuosen (musicians of the Wiener Philharmoniker)
 Ensemble Strumentale Scaligero (musicians of La Scala Philharmonic Orchestra)
 Maurizio Simeoli
 Mariangela Vacatello (Carnegie Hall - New York)
 Duo Favalessa-Semeraro (Società Filarmonica di Trento, Circolo Filologico of Milan)
 Maurizio Zanini (Rovereto Mozart Festival)
 Trio Dansi (Università Bocconi - Milan)
 Arcturus (Leeds Art Gallery)
 I Virtuosi Italiani (University of Nottingham, Newbury Spring Festival).

Further fields of interest 
Musicology (essays on 19th-20th century music), teaching, poetry, and computer-based drawing, as seen on the cover of the CD “PianOLYPHONY” recorded by Peter Bradley-Fulgoni (Foxglove Audio - FOX091) and in the score of “Geometria di un diletto” (edition db).

Partial list of works
Rima petrosa (2019) for piano
Das Eisemeer (2018) for piano
Fulgida (2018) for piano
Dionisiaco (2016) for piano
Verdigo (2013) for string quartet
Im Tempo eines Walzers (2012) for wind quintet and string quintet
Aristocanto (2012) for voice and piano
Geometria di un diletto (2011) for flute, clarinet, cello
Omaggio a Novaro (2011) for flute and piano
Sonata in 'F.''' (2009) for cello and pianoMusic stamps (2006) for pianoThrough a glass... (2001) for pianoSchegge (2001) for violin, cello, pianoTrilogia dell'assenza (1999-2000) for pianoAnsikte mot ansikte'' (1995-2000) for string quartet

External links
edition db: Di Gesu - profile (EN)
CPSM: Di Gesu - bio, recordings, e-mail (IT)
Arcturus: Di Gesu - profile (EN)
Bradley-Fulgoni, Peter. The mystery of modern dissonance. "arq" volume 16 number 2 - 2012; Cambridge University Press
CIDIM - COMITATO NAZIONALE ITALIANO MUSICA: Di Gesu - profile (IT)

References

1970 births
Living people
Italian composers
Italian male composers